When the Clouds of War Roll By is a World War I song composed by Earl Haubrich with lyrics by Nat Binns. It was published in 1917 by Ted Browne Music Co. in Chicago, Illinois.

Chorus

This work can be found at the Pritzker Military Museum & Library.

References 

Bibliography
Parker, Bernard S. World War I Sheet Music 1. Jefferson: McFarland & Company, Inc., 2007. . 
Vogel, Frederick G. World War I Songs: A History and Dictionary of Popular American Patriotic Tunes, with Over 300 Complete Lyrics. Jefferson: McFarland & Company, Inc., 1995. .

External links 
 Sheet music cover and song MP3 at the Illinois Digital Archive

1917 songs
Songs of World War I